Queen is the debut studio album by the British rock band Queen. Released on 13 July 1973 by EMI Records in the UK and by Elektra Records in the US, it was recorded at Trident Studios and De Lane Lea Music Centre, London, with production by Roy Thomas Baker, John Anthony and the band members themselves.

The album was influenced by heavy metal and progressive rock. The lyrics are based on a variety of topics, including folklore ("My Fairy King") and religion ("Jesus"). Lead singer Freddie Mercury wrote five of the ten tracks, lead guitarist Brian May wrote four songs (including "Doing All Right", which he co-wrote with Tim Staffell while in the band Smile), and drummer Roger Taylor both wrote and sang "Modern Times Rock and Roll". The final song on the album is a short instrumental version of "Seven Seas of Rhye", the full version of which would appear on the band's second album, Queen II.

Background 
Queen, which played their first gig in June 1970, had been playing the club and college circuit in and around London for almost two years when they were asked to test out the new recording facilities at De Lane Lea Studios. The band came away with a polished demo tape of five songs: "Keep Yourself Alive", "The Night Comes Down", "Great King Rat", "Jesus", and "Liar". The group sent their demo to various record labels, but only received one offer: a low bid from Charisma records, which they declined as, according to their friend Ken Testi, they feared they "would always play second fiddle to Genesis and those other bands".

Producers John Anthony and Roy Thomas Baker visited De Lane Lea while the band were recording and were impressed by what they saw. They recommended Queen (band) to Barry and Norman Sheffield, who owned Trident Studios. The Sheffield brothers arranged for Queen to record at Trident; however, because the studio was very popular, Queen mainly recorded during studio downtime but were given free use of everything after the paying artists had left, including the latest technologies and production team. Trident also agreed to oversee the group's management, recording and publishing interests while they sought a record deal. One day, while waiting to use the studio, Freddie Mercury was asked to record vocals by producer Robin Geoffrey Cable, who was working on a version of "I Can Hear Music" and "Goin' Back". Mercury enlisted May and Taylor on the tracks, which were released on a single under the name Larry Lurex, a parody of Gary Glitter.

Recording 
The process of recording only during studio downtime—late evenings or overnight—lasted from April to November 1972. Roger Taylor recalled, "You could see the working girls at night through their laced curtains, so while we were mixing, we would have a little bit of diversion". The limitations of this arrangement led the band to focus on completing one track at a time, but problems arose almost immediately. The band had thought highly of their De Lane Lea demo tracks, but producer Roy Thomas Baker had them re-record the songs with better equipment. "Keep Yourself Alive" was the first song to be re-recorded, and Queen did not like the result. They recorded it again, but no mix met their standards. After seven or eight failed attempts, engineer Mike Stone stepped in, and his first try met with Queen's approval. Stone would stay on to engineer and eventually co-produce their next five albums. May later commented that "Between Roy [Thomas Baker] and I, we were fighting the whole time to find a place where we had the perfection but also the reality of performance and sound".

Another track that proved problematic was "Mad the Swine", which was to be the fourth track on the album between "Great King Rat" and "My Fairy King". Baker and Queen disagreed over the drum sound and percussion, and it was left off the album. It re-surfaced in 1991, remixed by David Richards, as both the B-side to the "Headlong" CD single in the UK, and on the Hollywood Records re-release of the album. 

Other recordings from this period, such as two Smile tracks ("Silver Salmon" and "Polar Bear"), "Rock and Roll Medley" (a live encore staple from the era), and the infamous track "Hangman" (whose existence was long denied officially, beyond live concert recordings), have surfaced in the form of a studio acetate disc.

Songs

Overview 
The music on Queen has been described as hard rock, progressive rock and heavy metal. The album showcased the influence of contemporary rock bands such as Led Zeppelin, Black Sabbath and Jethro Tull, while the lyrics were reflective of "mystical sword 'n' sorcerers themes" with "medieval landscapes." Michael Gallucci of Ultimate Classic Rock noted how "mostly Queen is a product of its time, bringing together prog, metal and even a little bit of folk music" and felt that the album "did little to separate the group from others exploring similar territory in the early '70s." David Chiu of Medium opined that Mercury's songs were similar in style to the works of J. R. R. Tolkien, whereas Brian May's songs "were also baroque-sounding at times, albeit more introspective."

Side one

"Keep Yourself Alive" 

Brian May wrote "Keep Yourself Alive" after the band had been formed but before John Deacon joined, as confirmed by former bass player Barry Mitchell (on an unofficial question and answer session held on an online forum). According to Brian May in a radio special about their 1977 album, News of the World, he had penned the lyrics thinking of them as ironic and tongue-in-cheek, but their sense was completely changed when Freddie Mercury sang them. Roger Taylor and Brian May sing the vocal bridge of the song.

Former bassists and the band themselves recall that Freddie Mercury might have helped on the musical arrangements based on the fact that the band were in a more collaborative period in the pre-studio days, and he usually got his way with structural ideas. While it is highly possible that he contributed ideas to the song (the modulation types and the expanded form are closer to his style than to May's), even in that case Freddie Mercury would be more a co-arranger than a co-writer per se (like George Martin on The Beatles' songs).

"Doing All Right" 
"Doing All Right" was written by Brian May and Tim Staffell while in Smile, however, it was never released on Smile, only on Queen. This is one of the few Queen songs to feature Brian May on the piano. He also played his old Hallfredh acoustic guitar on this track and on later tracks such as "White Queen (As It Began)" and "Jealousy". The band played this song as early as 1970, and it was notable as the band's first song  Freddie Mercury played live on the piano. Staffell sang it when it was a Smile song, and Freddie Mercury tried to sing in the same manner when it became a Queen (band) song. This song is not played much at concerts, played at least once at Earls Court's in 1977.

"Great King Rat" 
This song, written by Freddie Mercury, is an example of Queen's earliest sound, with lengthy, heavy compositions, long guitar solos, and sudden tempo changes.

"My Fairy King" 
"My Fairy King", written by Freddie Mercury, deals with Rhye, a fantasy world he created with his younger sister and which features in other Queen songs, most notably "Seven Seas of Rhye". Freddie Mercury borrowed some lines from Robert Browning's poem "The Pied Piper of Hamelin". The song was written while the band was in the studio, and contains many vocal overdubbed harmonies, which Freddie Mercury was fond of. Roger Taylor also displays his high vocal range, hitting the highest notes in the composition. The vocal overdubs technique would later be used in many Queen songs, most notably "Bohemian Rhapsody". 

Brian May said that after the lyric "Mother Mercury, look what they've done to me" was written, Freddie Mercury claimed he was singing about his own mother. Subsequently, Freddie Bulsara took the stage name Freddie Mercury. This was another attempt to separate him from his stage persona. As Freddie Mercury once explained, "When I'm performing I'm an extrovert, yet inside I'm a completely different man."

"My Fairy King" is the first song on the album to feature Freddie Mercury's piano skills – as the piano on "Doing All Right" was played by Brian May, who was quite impressed by Freddie Mercury's piano playing on the track. From this point on Freddie Mercury handled most of Queen's piano parts.

Side two

"Liar" 

Originally titled "Lover," the rudiments of this song were written by Freddie Mercury and guitarist Mike Bersin from Freddie Mercury's earlier group, Ibex. Queen reworked it, and Freddie Mercury took full credit since he had written the lyrics. As mentioned on the transcription on EMI Music Publishing's Off the Record sheet music, this is one of the band's few 1970s tracks to feature a Hammond organ.  "Liar" was a staple of early concerts, but its inclusion was intermittent in later years, before returning in a shortened form for The Works Tour.  For the Magic Tour, it was shortened to just the opening guitar section as a segue into "Tear It Up".

"The Night Comes Down" 
Brian May wrote this song shortly after the band's formation in 1970, following the break-up of Smile. It was first recorded at De Lane Lea Studios in December 1971, when the band were hired to test the studio's new equipment in exchange for being allowed to record proper demos for their attempt to find a label. 

In 1972, Trident Studios signed Queen to a recording contract, but limited them to work only during studio down-time. They began working with Roy Thomas Baker who, along with owners/management Norman and Barry Sheffield, insisted on re-recording the five De Lane Lea demos. A new version of "The Night Comes Down" was recorded, but the band were unsatisfied with the results and the original demo was used on the album. With the release of the original De Lane Lea demos as bonus tracks in 2011, the difference in the mix of "The Night Comes Down" is quite noticeable when compared to the original LP and digital remasters. The demo is roughly the same mix that appeared on the album except for a distinct difference in the drum sound.

The song follows what would become trademark May themes such as coming-of-age, nostalgia over the loss of childhood, and the difficulties of adult life. There is also what could be an ambiguous reference to the Beatles song "Lucy in the Sky with Diamonds", in the lyric: "When I was young it came to me; And I could see the sun breaking; Lucy was high and so was I; Dazzling, holding the world inside." May is a Beatles fan and has commented in numerous interviews on their impact on him.

"Modern Times Rock 'n' Roll" 
Roger Taylor wrote and sang the song, which was re-recorded on two occasions for the BBC. The first dates from December 1973 and was broadcast on John Peel's show. This version was eventually released on the 1989 Queen album At The Beeb, and sounds similar to the album version. The second re-recording dates from April 1974 and was first broadcast on Bob Harris's show. The later version, only available on bootleg recordings prior to the release of On Air, differs from the original album version in its slower tempo and additional vocals from Mercury.

In the concert versions included in Live at the Rainbow '74, Mercury handled lead vocals.

"Son and Daughter" 
"Son and Daughter" was written by Brian May and was the B-side for the single "Keep Yourself Alive". The song was played in the very first concert under the name of Queen in 1970. It was a regular feature in Queen's live set until well into 1976. The song originally housed his famous guitar solo, but the album version does not feature the solo. The solo would not be properly recorded until 1974, with "Brighton Rock" from Sheer Heart Attack. Until this time, and occasionally afterward, the guitar solo would take over the middle of "Son and Daughter" during concerts, allowing the rest of the band a bit of a rest and costume change.

Unlike other songs from Queen's early period which crept back into circulation in the live set of their 1984–86 tours, such as "Liar", "Keep Yourself Alive", "Seven Seas of Rhye" and "In the Lap of the Gods...Revisited", "Son and Daughter" stayed off the setlists after Queen's hit singles began to dominate their live show. The song is indicative of their very earliest sound, influenced by blues rock and heavy metal.

"Jesus" 
The lyrics tell part of the story of Jesus of Nazareth. Freddie Mercury, credited with writing the song, was a Parsi Zoroastrian. The track features a two-chord rhythm section during the verses with a long instrumental break toward the end of the song. Because of the effects created by May's Red Special guitar, among other things, many early followers of Queen viewed the band as something of a psychedelic rock band.

"Seven Seas of Rhye" 

Mercury had only half-written "Seven Seas of Rhye" when they were recording the first album. They intended to use it as an outro here and start Queen II with the finished version. This idea was later abandoned, but the song would become Queen's first hit single.

Release 
Though the album was completed and fully mixed by November 1972, Trident Studios spent months trying to get a record company to release it. After eight months of failing that, they took the initiative and released it themselves in a license deal with EMI Records on 13 July 1973. During this time, Queen had begun writing material for their next album, but they were disheartened by the album's delay, feeling they had grown past that stage, even though the record-buying public was just getting wind of them. They recorded two BBC sessions during the interim. The first single, "Keep Yourself Alive" (the Mike Stone mix, now considered the standard album version), was released a week before the album (UK dates, 6 and 13 July respectively). The US single was issued in October. All countries had the B-side "Son and Daughter". The album was released in the US on 4 September.

Elektra Records released a single of "Liar" in a heavily edited form on 14 February 1974, with the B-side "Doing All Right". Elektra later reissued the edited version of "Keep Yourself Alive" in July 1975, this time with a double B-side of "Lily of the Valley" and "God Save the Queen". Both versions are different from the album versions.

Hollywood Records released a CD single featuring five versions of "Keep Yourself Alive" to promote the forthcoming Crown Jewels box set (1998). The versions on the CD are "Long Lost Re-take", "BBC Session No. 1 Version", "Live Killers Version", "Album Version (Unremastered)", and "Album Version (1998 Remastered Version)".

Reception 

Rolling Stone wrote, "There's no doubt that this funky, energetic English quartet has all the tools they'll need to lay claim to the Zep's abdicated heavy-metal throne, and beyond that to become a truly influential force in the rock world. Their debut album is superb." The Winnipeg Free Press opined that Queen borrowed from other artists, but also compared the album favourably to Led Zeppelin, writing, "the band manages to inject such a fresh, energetic touch to most of it that I don't mind a bit... With its first album, Queen has produced a driving, high energy set which in time may be looked upon with the same reverence Led Zep 1 now receives." Illinois' Daily Herald also commended the record, writing "Good listening is guaranteed in songs like 'Keep Yourself Alive,' 'Great King Rat' and 'Doing All Right'."

In later years, AllMusic awarded the album three out of five stars, calling it a "patchy but promising debut from a classic rock group". In 1994, Guitarist Magazine ranked Queen the 19th most influential guitar album of all time. The album placed at number 54 in NMEs "100 Greatest Albums You’ve Never Heard" in 2011. In 2008, Rolling Stone ranked "Keep Yourself Alive" number 31 in the "100 Greatest Guitar Songs of All Time", describing it as "an entire album's worth of riffs crammed into a single song". It has also been cited as heavy metal journalist Martin Popoff's favorite record of all time.

Writing for Classic Rock in 2016, Malcolm Dome ranked Queen as the band's second greatest album. He described it as a "glorious hard rock marathon unlike anything else around at the time", and commented on the "unmistakably unique sound of Brian May's home-made guitar", the "panoramic production of Roy Thomas Baker" and the "soaring voice of Freddie Mercury", adding "the record was just too powerful, too multi-dimensional and too stunning to sit happily and contentedly in the grooves. The performances were all virtuoso."

Track listing

Original release
All lead vocals by Freddie Mercury unless noted. The band included the comment "and nobody played synthesiser" on the album sleeve, a purist principle of May's, as some listeners had mistaken their elaborate multi-tracking and effects, produced by guitar and vocals, as synthesisers. John Deacon was credited as "Deacon John", but after the release of the album, he asked to be referred to by his real name. Roger Taylor was credited as Roger Meddows-Taylor, his full name, but that was discontinued after the next album.

2011 Universal Music reissue

iTunes deluxe edition (2011)

Personnel 
Queen
 Freddie Mercury – lead vocals , piano , Hammond organ  (uncredited), backing vocals
 Brian May – guitars, piano , backing vocals
 Roger Taylor (credited as Roger Meddows-Taylor) – drums, percussion, lead vocals , backing vocals
 John Deacon (credited as Deacon John) – bass guitar

Additional musicians
 John Anthony – backing vocals

Charts

Certifications

Notes

References

External links 
 Queen official website: Discography: Queen: includes lyrics of all non-bonus tracks
 Early Queen recordings

Queen (band) albums
1973 debut albums
Albums produced by John Anthony (record producer)
Albums produced by Roy Thomas Baker
Albums recorded at Trident Studios
Elektra Records albums
EMI Records albums
Hollywood Records albums
Parlophone albums